Gallows Hill (1997) is a supernatural thriller novel for young adults by Lois Duncan. It was her first and only young adult novel written after the death of her daughter. It was written eight years after her previous young adult novel, Don't Look Behind You. It is about a girl who moves to a small town with a secret.

Plot
Sarah Zoltanne is an extraordinary girl. Her widowed mother, Rosemary, decides to move to Pinecrest because of Ted Thompson. When Sarah starts school as the new pupil, she makes no friends. Role-playing takes on a terrifying cast when 17-year-old Sarah, who is posing as a fortune-teller for a school fair, begins to see actual visions that can predict the future. Frightened, the other students brand her a witch, setting off a chain of events that mirror the centuries-old Salem witch trials in more ways than one.

Reception
Gallows Hill has received several honors and awards. In 1997, Gallows Hill was designated a Junior Library Guild Selection. A year later, the novel was listed as an American Library Association (ALA) Quick Pick for Reluctant Young Adult Readers, and the New York Public Library listed it as a Book for the Teen Age. In 2000, Gallows Hill won the Nevada Young Readers' Award in the Young Adult category. One year later, it was given the 2000–2001 Tennessee Volunteer State Book Award for Young Adults.

Film adaptation

A TV film called I've Been Waiting For You (1998), loosely based on the novel, was made. It was an NBC Movie of the Week and starred Sarah Chalke, Markie Post, Ben Foster, and Soleil Moon Frye.

See also

Salem Witch Trials
Gallows Hill (disambiguation)
Witchcraft

References

Further reading

1997 American novels
American novels adapted into films
American young adult novels
American thriller novels
Paranormal novels
American novels adapted into television shows
Novels set in Missouri
Novels by Lois Duncan
Delacorte Press books